Luis Soares (born 24 March 1964 in Nazaré, Leiria) is a former long-distance runner. He represented France at the 1992 Summer Olympics in Barcelona, Spain. He set his personal best (2:10:03) in the classic distance in 1992.

Achievements
All results regarding marathon, unless stated otherwise

References

1964 births
Living people
French male long-distance runners
Portuguese male long-distance runners
Athletes (track and field) at the 1992 Summer Olympics
Olympic athletes of France
Paris Marathon male winners
People from Nazaré, Portugal
Sportspeople from Leiria District

French people of Portuguese descent